is a mountain pass in the south-end of the Hidaka Mountains of Hokkaidō, Japan. Snow is possible on the pass from October to April. Japan National Route 236 crosses the pass between Hiroo and Urakawa.

See also
Mount Nozuka

References

 Geographical Survey Institute
 Northern Road Navi

Mountain passes of Japan